.com for Murder is a 2001 science fiction horror film film written by Nico Mastorakis and Phill Marr and directed by Mastorakis, starring Nastassja Kinski, Nicollette Sheridan, Roger Daltrey, and Huey Lewis. After being screened at various film festivals, it was released direct-to-video on January 14, 2003.

Plot 

Ben (Daltrey) is a successful and rich architect, living in Los Angeles. Sondra (Kinski) is his beloved wife, who broke a leg while skiing. As Ben is leaving town for his work, Sondra accesses his intelligent house computer Hal, and discovers that Ben has been chatting on "American Love Online". Posing as him, she chats with one of his online friends, Lynn (Valentine), and they agree to meet that night. Hacker Werther (Dean) rudely joins the conversation and later shuts out Sondra, and starts chatting in Ben's name. Sondra is meanwhile joined by her sister Misty (Sheridan), who came to look after her. Later that night Werther kills Lynn in her house, showing an online live feed of the murder to Sondra and Misty. Werther is shown to be a psychopath who loves to quote from The Sorrows of Young Werther by Goethe and calls his victims by the name Lotte (the object of the affections of Werther in that novel).

Sondra and Misty call the police and eventually speak with FBI agent Matheson (Lewis). When they send him the file of the murder, it appears to be encrypted. On the advice of agent Matheson, Sondra and Misty invite a computer expert to decrypt the file. As the expert arrives at the door, Werther calls them, pretending to be the expert. Sondra and Misty thus send the real expert away, believing he is the killer. A short while later, Werther shows up at the house, keeping his disguise. After he finishes the decrypting job and leaves the house, Misty walks after him to inform him that the gate is jammed. Werther suddenly turns towards her and cuts her left wrist slightly, just enough to keep her living for another 20 minutes, all the while viewed by Sondra from the computer. Werther then turns to enter the house and kill Sondra, but Sondra manages to lock the main entrance in time to prevent this. Werther then tries to open the pool door, but is electrocuted with 22,000 volts by Hal.

Sondra bandages Misty's wrist and tries to restore power to the house. Werther turns out not to be dead and in the meantime takes Misty. Carrying a passive night vision device that amplifies light 60,000 times, he is stunned by a lightning flash and falls off the second floor, coming to his death. Agent Matheson, his assistant agent Williams (Clarke) and the police finally arrive at the scene, after electronic disinformation by Werther had previously sent them to the other end of town.

Cast 
 Nastassja Kinski as Sondra Brummel
 Nicollette Sheridan as Misty Brummel
 Roger Daltrey as Ben
 Huey Lewis as FBI agent Matheson
 Jeffery Dean as Werther
 Kim Valentine as Lynn
 Melinda Clarke as Michelle Williams

Release and reception 
.com for Murder was released on DVD on January 14, 2003.

Felix Vasquez Jr. of Cinema Crazed deemed it a "terrible remake of Rear Window", full of clichés and illogical. He said that Sheridan's and Daltrey's talent was lost through mis-casting and disliked Mastorakis' unrealistic portrayal of computers.

References

External links 
 
 
 

2001 films
2000s thriller films
American science fiction horror films
American thriller films
2000s crime drama films
American crime drama films
The Sorrows of Young Werther
2001 drama films
2003 drama films
2003 films
Films directed by Nico Mastorakis
2000s English-language films
2000s American films